Pseudohemihyalea melas is a moth in the family Erebidae. It was described by Paul Dognin in 1902. It is found in Colombia.

References

External links 

Moths described in 1902
melas